Charles G. Eric Forsyth (10 January 1885 – 24 February 1951) was a British water polo player who competed in the 1908 Summer Olympics. He was part of the British team, which was able to win the gold medal.

See also
 Great Britain men's Olympic water polo team records and statistics
 List of Olympic champions in men's water polo
 List of Olympic medalists in water polo (men)

References

External links
 

1885 births
1951 deaths
British male water polo players
Water polo players at the 1908 Summer Olympics
Olympic water polo players of Great Britain
Olympic gold medallists for Great Britain
Olympic medalists in water polo
Medalists at the 1908 Summer Olympics